Orthosia rubescens, the ruby Quaker, is a species of cutworm or dart moth in the family Noctuidae. It is found in North America.

The MONA or Hodges number for Orthosia rubescens is 10487.

References

Further reading

External links

 

Orthosia
Articles created by Qbugbot
Moths described in 1865